A console game is a type of video game consisting of images and often sounds generated by a video game console, which are displayed on a television or similar audio-video system, and that can be manipulated by a player. This manipulation usually takes place using a handheld device connected to the console, called a controller. The controller generally contains several buttons and directional controls such as analogue joysticks, each of which has been assigned a purpose for interacting with and controlling the images on the screen. The display, speakers, console, and controls of a console can also be incorporated into one small object known as a handheld game.

Console games usually come in the form of an optical disc, ROM cartridge, digital download or, in the case of dedicated consoles, stored on internal memory. The global console games market was valued at about $26.8 billion in 2018.

The differences between consoles create additional challenges and opportunities for game developers, as the console manufacturers (e.g. Nintendo, Microsoft, Sony, Sega, Atari) may provide extra incentives, support and marketing for console exclusive games. To aid development of games for consoles, manufacturers often create game development kits that developers can use for their work.

History

Early console games 

The first console games were for the Magnavox Odyssey, released in 1972, and consisted of simple games made of three white dots and a vertical line. These hardware limitations, such as the lack of any audio capability, meant that developers didn't have freedom in the type of games they could create. Some games came packaged with accessories such as cards and dice to enhance the experience and make up for the shortcomings of the hardware.

The second generation of consoles introduced more powerful capabilities, less hardware limitations than the first generation, and coincided with the golden age of arcade video games. Developers had access to the console's basic graphical capabilities, allowing them to create sprites of their choosing and more advanced sound capabilities. Controllers were beginning to include more buttons giving developers more freedom in the type of interactions they could provide to the player.

Due to the success of arcades, several games were adapted and released on consoles. In many cases, the quality had to be reduced because of the hardware limitations of consoles, but their popularity persisted: Pac-Man for the Atari 2600, a port of the original arcade game of the same name, was the best selling game for the console. 

The second generation of games introduced a number of notable gaming concepts for the first time. Adventure for the Atari 2600 introduced the concept of a virtual space bigger than the screen for the first time, with the game consisting of multiple rooms the player could visit as opposed to a single static screen. Video Olympics was one of the first console games to have a computer controlled opponent in its "Robot Pong" game mode and genres such as platforming and graphical adventure games emerged.

Video game industry crash 

By the end of 1983, consoles had become cheaper to develop and produce, causing a saturation of consoles which in turn led to their libraries becoming saturated too. Due to this saturation of the market, the prices of games were low and, despite good sales figures, developers weren't making enough profit from sales to justify staying in the market.

Despite heavy marketing, the quality of the games could not back up their claims, causing many companies to go out of business. The effects of the crash were primarily felt in the North American market but it still had an impact, albeit smaller, on the Asian and European markets.

In the years following the crash, console development was significantly reduced in the North American and European markets. Personal computers rose in popularity and began to fill the gap in the market that consoles had left. They had become affordable, were technologically superior, and had multiple other functions beyond gaming.

Third and fourth generations 

The release of new consoles from Nintendo, Sega and Atari signified the start of the third (and fourth) generations, which also saw the introduction of notable franchises such as The Legend of Zelda, Star Fox, Sonic the Hedgehog, Final Fantasy, Metal Gear and Metroid.

The console manufacturers took back control of third-party development and regulated the market. Measures were introduced to ensure saturation did not happen again, including limiting the number of games a developer could release a year, controlling the manufacture of game cartridges, demanding payment for cartridges upfront, and ensuring newly developed games adhered to a set of rules set by console manufacturers. This put pressure on publishers and added a risk to development. It meant developers were forced to concentrate on the quality of their games more so than the quantity and speed at which they could be made.

Atari and Sega incorporated backward compatibility in the Atari 7800 and Master System respectively, elongating the lifespan of their early console games. Both companies never released another backward compatible console, with the partial exception that Master System games can be played on the Sega Genesis using a separately sold peripheral.

During this time, Metroid became notable for its open world the player could traverse in all directions, while most similar games were still primarily side-scrolling in a single direction. It also featured a strong female protagonist who is often credited for improving the portrayal of women in gaming. Star Fox was Nintendo's first use of polygonal graphics and Sonic the Hedgehog introduced a rival to Nintendo's mascot, Mario, who became a long-standing character for Sega in a number of different types of media.

From 2D to 3D 

The fifth generation of consoles saw the move from 2D to 3D graphics and the change in storage media from cartridges to optical discs. Analogue controllers became popular, allowing for a finer and smoother movement control scheme compared to the directional pad. The use of full motion video became popular for cutscenes as optical discs allowed for the storage of high quality video with pre-rendered graphics that a game couldn't render in real time.

Games released during the fifth generation took advantage of the new 3D technology with a number of notable franchises moving from 2D, such as Metal Gear, Final Fantasy, Mario and The Legend of Zelda, the latter being considered influential not only to its genre but to video games as a whole. Other games that were released during this generation, such as Crash Bandicoot, GoldenEye 007, Resident Evil, Tomb Raider, and FIFA International Soccer, were influential in their own genres and started their own franchises that would span multiple generations and consoles. Resident Evil founded the genre of survival horror, while Metal Gear Solid popularised the stealth genre as well as storytelling through cinematic cutscenes rendered in game. Gran Turismo and Sega Rally Championship popularised realism in the racing genre with different surfaces and realistic features such as tire grip.

Internet capabilities 
By the sixth generation the console market had become larger than the PC market.

While earlier consoles did provide online capabilities, it wasn't until the sixth generation that online services became popular. Games introduced online features such as downloadable content, social features, and online multiplayer. Online networks were created by console developers such as PlayStation Network and Xbox Live providing a platform for games to utilise. Online multiplayer allowed players to play together from almost anywhere in the world, the social features of the platforms giving players the means to organise over these long distances.

Downloadable content became more prominent, allowing developers to release updates after a game was launched and include new content or fixes to existing issues.

Technology

Inputs 
 
Console games receive commands from the player through the use of an input device, commonly called a controller. Unlike a PC which uses a keyboard and mouse or a mobile device that uses a touch interface, console games are limited in their control schemes by the hardware available for the console. They usually include a method to move the player character (joystick, d-pad or analogue stick) and a variation of buttons to perform other in-game actions such as jumping or interacting with the game world. The type of controller available to a game can fundamentally change the style of how a console game will or can be played.

The limitation of the amount of buttons compared to a PC keyboard or a custom arcade cabinet means that controller buttons will commonly perform multiple different actions. For example, The Witcher 3 Xbox One controls uses the same button, the "A" button, to interact with the world when pressed and sprint when held, whereas the PC control scheme can separate these functions into separate buttons. The limitation of input keys can allow developers to create a more refined and succinct control scheme that can be learned by the player more easily. Different games in the same genre tend to use similar control schemes, allowing players to easily adapt to new games.

There are games that require additional accessories to act as alternative ways to control the game and to bypass the limitations of a standard game controller. Such items can include light guns, electronic instruments or racing wheels.

Display  
Consoles commonly use a television as their visual output device: optimal for viewing at a greater distance by a larger audience. As a result, many video games are designed for local multiplayer play, with all players viewing the same TV set, with the screen divided into several sections and each player using a different controller.

Console games have generally had access to less computing power, less flexible computing power, and lower resolution displays, than games played on a PC. However, dedicated consoles were advanced graphically, especially in animation, as video game consoles had dedicated graphics hardware, were able to load data instantly from ROM, and had a low resolution output which would look better on a television, due to it naturally blurring the pixels.

Storage 
Storage mediums play an important role in the development of a console game as it creates a fixed limit on the amount and quality of content that a game can have. Unlike arcade games but similar to PC and handheld games, console games are generally distributed separately from their platforms and require a form of storage to hold their data. There are 3 primary types of storage medium for consoles – cartridges, optical discs, and hard disk drives, all of which have considerably improved over time and provide more storage space to developers with each improvement.

Cartridge 

Early cartridges had storage limitations which grew in size as the technology developed. They provided more security against third-party developers and the illegal copying of games. Some could be partially re-writable allowing for games to save their data to the cartridge itself meaning no extra saving media was required.

While cartridges became less popular with the introduction of disc based media, they are still popular to use for handheld consoles and are still in use on consoles in later generations such as the Nintendo Switch.

Disc 

Discs became popular as the storage medium for console games during the fifth generation due to the ability to store large amounts of data and be produced cheaply. The increase in space provided developers with a medium to store higher quality assets, the downside being that progress could not be saved directly to the disc as it could with a cartridge. Most consoles that used discs had a means of saving games either on the console or in the form of a separate memory card, meaning developers had to control the size of their game saves.

Console storage 

It is common for games after generation six to be stored partially or fully on the console itself, most commonly on a hard drive. Similarly to how a PC game can be installed, the console game can copy key files to the console's storage medium, which is used to decrease load times but still requires the original game storage medium to play. The second method is for the game to be fully stored on the console and run directly from it, requiring no physical media to run at all. This offers players the opportunity to have games which have no physicality and can be downloaded through the Internet to their console, as well as giving the developers the ability to provide updates and fixes in the same manner, effectively meaning development on a game doesn't have to stop once released.

As there is only a fixed amount of space on a console by default, developers do still have to be mindful of the amount of space they can take up, especially if the install is compulsory. Some consoles provide users the ability to expand their storage with larger storage mediums, provide access to removable storage and release versions of their console with more storage.

Cloud gaming 

Cloud gaming services allow players to access games as a streaming service. Specialist hardware is not usually required to access these services and can be run from most modern PC operating systems, negating the need for a dedicated device for console gaming. The question of ownership is the biggest difference in comparison to other storage mediums for console games, as they could be considered only a method of renting the game.

OnLive is a cross between a console and other game streaming software. They provide hardware, considered to be a microconsole, that would connect to their service but only as means of displaying streamed content.

Emulation 

To play console games on any other device than the console it has been developed for, emulation of that console is required whether it is software or hardware based emulation and some console developers will provide this as a means to play games from their older systems on newer devices. For example, the Xbox 360 provides some access to Xbox games and the Wii's Virtual Console has a customised emulator with each game tweaked to provide the best performance as opposed to a single emulator to do everything.

Games' effect on console sales 

While a PC is multi-functional and will be purchased to perform tasks other than gaming, a dedicated gaming console must have games available for it to be successful. A good library of games will give a consumer reason to purchase the console and in turn create opportunities for more games to be created for it. Console developers will lower their profit margins on devices to encourage sales of the games as more profit can be obtained from software royalties than the sale of the consoles themselves.

Games are frequently used to market a console and can do so either by exclusivity to a specific console or by using existing popular intellectual properties (IPs) that already have a strong following. Pac-Man for the Atari 2600 was already a well known arcade game and was expected to help the sales of 2600 devices due to its popularity despite it being heavily criticized.

Mascots 
A strong mascot can come organically from a game and can play a large part of a console's marketing strategy. A well designed and popular mascot will naturally generate further games. A good example of a mascot who has come from an existing game is Nintendo's Mario. He was created as a character for the Donkey Kong arcade game and wasn't expected to become popular yet has gone onto become one of the most iconic gaming characters in history.

A character from a game can be designed to serve as a mascot, such as Sonic the Hedgehog. He was created with the intent to rival Mario and was designed with abilities to counter Mario's weaknesses.

Both mascots exist outside of their respective video games and have become a part of the identity of each company, appearing in various types of media such as TV shows, books, and movies, as well as a large number of other video games.

Following the emergence of mascots during the late 1980s and early 1990s, for a few years it was considered essential to a console's sales that it have a game starring a popular mascot. However, video game mascots became increasingly unimportant to console sales during the mid-1990s, as the gaming industry's main demographic grew older and thus less likely to find mascots appealing, with consoles' increased performance as well as cross-licensing demonstrating higher selling power. A number of once-successful mascots such as Bonk, Gex, Bubsy, and Zool were dropped from usage in both marketing and software releases during this time. The few surviving mascots remain relevant due to their value in increasing brand awareness.

Development 
The core development process for a console game is very similar to its counterparts and primarily differs in the high level concept due to demographics and the technical back-end. Consoles developers will usually make a development kit available to game developers which they can use to test their games on with more ease than a consumer model.

Early console games were commonly created by a single person and could be changed in a short amount of time due to the simplicity of the games at the time. As technology has improved, the development time, complexity and cost of console games has increased dramatically, to where the size of a team for an eighth generation game can number in the hundreds. Similarly, the programming languages used in video game development has changed over time with early games being developed primarily in assembly. As time went on developers had more choice on what they could use based on the availability on the console but some languages became more popular than others.

First and third party development 
Many console developers have a branch of the company that develops games for their console and are considered "first party" developers, a concept that isn't seen in PC development due to the variation of hardware configurations and lack of complete ownership of a system by a single manufacturer. First party developers have the advantage of having direct access to the console's development, which allows them to make the most of the hardware they are developing for.

Companies that are separate from the console manufacturer are considered to be "third-party" developers. They commonly have restrictions placed upon them and their games by the console manufacturers as a way of controlling the library of their consoles.

Comparison between arcade, PC and handheld games 
The primary differences between arcade game development and game development for other platforms are the fact that players are required to pay a small amount per play session, and that arcade games are mostly found at external venues. Arcade games are ultimately developed to try to get a continuous stream of revenue from the player and to keep them playing over the life of the machine. By comparison, console games have a high cost up front, meaning they have to guarantee a different experience for the player, primarily more content.

Handheld games, on the other hand, need to be accessible and enjoyable on a portable device, and should usually playable within a shorter time frame. This ultimately affects the type of games that are developed for portable consoles. Games that rely on long, unbroken sessions of gameplay or long cutscenes are not ideal for handhelds, whereas a console or PC player is expected to have longer play sessions. On handheld consoles of a smaller size, developers need to consider the amount of detail that will be visible to the player whereas console developers can safely assume their games will be played on a larger screen such as a television.

In comparison to PC and mobile games, console game developers must consider the limitations of the hardware their game is being developed for, as it is unlikely to have any major changes between the development phase and release. PC and mobile technology progresses quickly and there are many different configurations of their hardware and software. This is beneficial at the start of a console's life cycle, as the technology will be cutting edge, but as the console ages, developers are forced to work with ageing hardware until the next generation of consoles is released. Earlier consoles games could be developed to take advantage of the fixed limitations of the consoles they were developed for, such as the MegaDrive's capability of fast scrolling influencing design decisions made for Sonic the Hedgehog. Due to these hardware limitations the requirement of development kits and licenses required for development on a console is commonplace.

Developers of console games are also required to pay royalties to the console developers, while there is no centralised hardware developer for the PC equivalent.

Development kits 

Early consoles didn't have development kit versions; it was only around the fifth generation of consoles that development kits became common. Unlike PC games, console game development usually requires the use of a development kit for the console that the game is being developed for, as the hardware is often proprietary and is not freely available. The use of a development kit allows developers to access more detail about how their game is running on the kit and other advanced debugging options. The downside of needing access to specialist hardware such as a development kit is that it limits accessibility for hobbyists creating homemade or custom content. This grew into a benefit for PC games, as there is a more open environment for hobbyists to create and modify content even without developer support.

Some console developers have provided tools, such as the Net Yaroze software development kit, in an attempt to provide an avenue for hobbyists to create content.

Remakes and re-releases 

Console games primarily started off as ports of arcade games. The timing of early consoles coincided with the golden age of arcade games which gave developers a good opportunity to maximise on their popularity, despite console hardware not yet being strong enough to run the games as they were originally. Arcade games effectively had to be remade for consoles, which usually meant lowering the quality in some way to make up for any hardware limitations. As technology improved and arcades reduced in popularity, it became console original games that would start to be ported to other devices.

Some consoles lack the ability to play games from previous generations, which allows a developer to release older games again but on the new consoles. The re-released game may be unchanged and simply be the same game but run on the new technology, or it may be changed by the developer to have improved graphics, sound or gameplay, a process known as remastering. Some re-releases can have added features, such as Final Fantasy VII, which added functions to speed the game up and turn off random enemy encounters.

When high definition technology was released, many games received high definition remakes. These can vary in terms of features, but usually include higher resolution textures, re-rendered videos, higher quality audio, and compatibility with newer display technologies. High definition remakes offer an additional revenue stream for a console game that was potentially at the end of its life. The developer of the remake is not always the same as the developer of the original game and some developers and publishers, such as Double Eleven, specialise in ports and remakes of other games.

Additional content  
The development of additional content prior to the internet was limited due to limited distribution methods; more often than not, content had to be released as a new game entirely as opposed to an add-on to an existing one. For example, Grand Theft Auto: Vice City used the same mechanics and engine but was released as a separate game from Grand Theft Auto III, whereas a PC title such as Total Annihilation offered downloadable content from 1997. While some Dreamcast games offered downloadable content, they were severely limited by the storage space of the console.

The first console games to offer downloadable content properly were for the Xbox. Downloadable content can range from small content additions like extra items to larger ones that may include significant plot additions and extend the game considerably.

It wasn't until the seventh generation, that console games began to support mods or custom content to the same extent as PC games.

Ratings and censorship 
 
Several systems exist worldwide to regulate the video games industry. Some, like the Entertainment Software Rating Board (ESRB) are composed of members of the industry themselves, while others, like Pan European Game Information (PEGI), are government-backed. The ESRB was started in 1994, was adopted as standard 10 years later, and is rated on the interactive experience as well as the content.

Criticism  
From time to time, video games have been criticized by parents' groups, psychologists, politicians, and some religious organizations for allegedly glorifying violence, cruelty, and crime, and exposing children to these elements. It is particularly disturbing to some that some video games allow children to act out crimes (for example, the Grand Theft Auto series), and reward them for doing so. Concerns that children who play violent video games may have a tendency to act more aggressively on the playground have led to voluntary rating systems adopted by the industry, such as the ESRB rating system in the United States and the PEGI rating system in Europe. They are aimed at educating parents about the types of games their children are playing, to let them make an informed decision on whether or not to allow them to play. Studies have shown that most parents who complain about their young children acting increasingly aggressive and violent on the school playground due to video games do not follow the ESRB and PEGI rating systems. Many parents complain about their children, as young as 8, acting out violence depicted in Call of Duty or Grand Theft Auto, even though their ratings indicate the recommended age as 18 and above.    
 
Most studies, however, reached the conclusion that violence in video games is not causally linked with aggressive tendencies. This was the conclusion of a 1999 study by the United States government, prompting Surgeon General David Satcher to say, "[...] we clearly associate media violence to aggressive behavior, but the impact was very small compared to other things. Some may not be happy with that, but that’s where the magic is." This was also the conclusion of a meta-analysis by psychologist Jonathan Freedman, who reviewed over 200 published studies and found that the majority did not find a causal link between violent tendencies and violence depicted in entertainment.    
 
Video game consoles were banned in China between June 2000 and July 2015.

Game sales

The lists of best-selling games by platform, organized by the respective console generations, are given below:

Second generation
 Atari 2600
Third generation
 NES
Fourth generation
 Sega Genesis
 SNES
 Game Boy
Fifth generation
 PlayStation
 Nintendo 64

Sixth generation
 PlayStation 2
 GameCube
 Xbox
 Game Boy Advance
Seventh generation
 Xbox 360
 PlayStation 3
 Wii
 Nintendo DS
 PlayStation Portable

Eighth generation
 Wii U
 PlayStation 4
 Xbox One
 Nintendo Switch
 Nintendo 3DS

See also  
 Game development kit 
 List of best-selling video games 
 List of gaming topics

References 

Video game platforms
Video game terminology